Joyce El-Khoury is a Lebanese-Canadian opera singer performing with leading opera companies and symphony orchestras around the world. She is a soprano praised for her bel canto singing.

Early life and education
El-Khoury was born in Beirut, Lebanon, to Jean and Alex El-Khoury. She has two sisters, Cynthia El-Khoury Najm and Krista Jane El-Khoury – the latter also a singer. She came to Ottawa, Ontario, with her family at the age of six, and began taking private voice lessons at the age of 15 with Karen Spicer. With support from her teacher and parents, she pursued voice at the University of Ottawa under the tutelage of Ingemar Korjus. After graduating her Bachelor of Music (Performance) at the University of Ottawa, she pursued her studies at the Academy of Vocal Arts (AVA) in Philadelphia while studying with Bill Schuman. El-Khoury was then invited to study at the Metropolitan Opera's Lindemann Young Artist Development Program while continuing her studies with Schuman. Her musical mentor and vocal coach is Laurent Philippe, with whom she regularly appears in recital.

Career
During the summer of 2010, El-Khoury was engaged by Lorin Maazel and the Castleton Festival to sing Lauretta in Gianni Schicchi and to cover the title role in Suor Angelica. On opening night, she was asked to step in to sing Suor Angelica; this marked the beginning of Maazel's mentorship. She went on to perform Rosina in Rossini's The Barber of Seville in Beijing, Mimì in Puccini's La bohème, the soprano part of Beethoven's Missa Solemnis in Munich and her first Desdemona in Verdi's Otello with Maazel.

She sang Mimì in her Australian debut in 2019 for Opera Australia at the Sydney Opera House.

Repertory

Recordings
 Mirra in Franz Liszt's Sardanapalo with conductor Kirill Karabits and the Staatskapelle Weimar, to be released in 2019, audite
 Antonina in Donizetti's Belisario with conductor Sir Mark Elder with the BBC Symphony Orchestra, released 2012, Opera Rara
 Pauline in Donizetti's Les martyrs with conductor Sir Mark Elder with the Orchestra of the Age of Enlightenment, released 2015, Opera Rara

Recognition and awards
 2005: First Prize Winner at Brian Law Opera Competition
 2006: First Prize Winner at Mario Lanza Vocal Competition
 2006: First Prize Winner and WRTI Radio Audience Favorite at Giargiari and Son Bel Canto Competition
 2008: First Prize Winner at George London Competition
 2014: El-Khoury was nominated for Best Young Artist at the International Opera Awards
 2014: Opera Rara's recording of Donizetti's Belisario with El-Khoury in the role of Antonina was nominated for Best Recording (Complete Opera) at the International Opera Awards
 2016: Opera Rara's recording of Donizetti's Les martyrs with El-Khoury in the role of Pauline won Best Recording (Complete Opera) at the International Opera Awards

References

External links 

 
 
 
 Profile at Columbia Artists Management

Year of birth missing (living people)
Living people
Musicians from Beirut
Academy of Vocal Arts alumni
Musicians from Ottawa
University of Ottawa alumni
Canadian operatic sopranos
21st-century Canadian women opera singers
Lebanese emigrants to Canada